The following low-power television stations broadcast on digital or analog channel 41 in the United States:

 K41HQ-D in Quanah, Texas, to move to channel 24
 WFRW-LD in Enterprise, Alabama, to move to channel 14
 WFYW-LP in Waterville, Maine, to move to channel 35

The following stations, which are no longer licensed, formerly broadcast on digital or analog channel 41:
 K41AF in Ukiah, California
 K41BW-D in New Mobeetie, Texas
 K41CB in Lucerne Valley, California
 K41CK in Ellensburg, Washington
 K41DC in Eureka, Utah
 K41FK in Tohatchi, New Mexico
 K41FQ in Springfield, Missouri
 K41FX in Spring Glen, Utah
 K41GI-D in Imlay, Nevada
 K41GT in Myton, Utah
 K41GV in Emery, Utah
 K41HH-D in Austin, Nevada
 K41HZ in Burns, Oregon
 K41IX in Medford, Oregon
 K41JE in Williams-Ashfork, Arizona
 K41JF-D in Hagerman, Idaho
 K41KZ-D in Chalfant Valley, California
 K41MX-D in Perryton, Texas
 KEYU-LP in Amarillo, Texas
 KJCX-LP in Helena, Montana
 KLMW-LD in Lufkin, Texas
 KMMA-CD in San Luis Obispo, California
 KNVV-LP in Reno, Nevada
 KPVM-LP in Pahrump, Nevada
 KQLP-LD in Lincoln, Nebraska
 KTJX-LD in College Station, Texas
 KXOC-LP in Oklahoma City, Oklahoma
 W41AO in Hampshire, etc., West Virginia
 W41AP in Sandusky, Ohio
 WLFW-LP in Lafayette, Georgia
 WRGX-LP in Dothan, Alabama
 WRZY-LD in Buxton, North Carolina

References

41 low-power